Joshua Ho-Sang (born January 22, 1996) is a Canadian professional ice hockey forward currently playing for the Salavat Yulaev Ufa of the Kontinental Hockey League (KHL). He was selected by the New York Islanders in the first round, 28th overall, in the 2014 NHL Entry Draft.

The Toronto Sun described him in June 2014 as a "singular hockey player of immense talent, caught on an island of discourse." He said of himself: "I'm more emotional than most people. That poses a problem for the hockey world. A lot of players are trained to hold their emotions... I love to dangle. I love to play an offensive game. I love to celebrate when I score."

Early and personal life
Ho-Sang was born in Toronto, Ontario and is of Chinese, black Jamaican, Russian-Jewish, and Swedish heritage. He grew up in the Thornhill neighbourhood of the Regional Municipality of York, in the Toronto suburbs. He said he has "always celebrated the Jewish holidays like Chanukah and the High Holidays with family and friends," as well as Christmas and Easter.  When he was 17 years old, Toronto Sun writer Steve Simmons predicted that he "might be better than all" the previous Jewish ice hockey players (which included the then-current Jewish NHL players centre Michael Cammalleri, right winger Mike Brown, left winger Eric Nystrom, and centre Jeff Halpern).

His father, Wayne, is a black Jamaican professional tennis player from Kingston, Jamaica, whose grandfather is Chinese from Hong Kong; he was also a member of the reggae band Fujahtive. His business analyst mother, Ericka, is Jewish and was born in Santiago, Chile, to Russian and Swedish parents. His father immigrated to Canada from Jamaica at the age of 10, and his mother immigrated to Canada from Chile at the age of 12.

His brother Khole is five years his junior.  At age 13 in November 2014, Khole was a member of Team Ontario in American football and was slated to play for Canada in the 2015 Snooper Bowl, an international Pop Warner Football competition. As a first degree black belt in taekwondo, he finished second in his category at Nationals in 2014, and was named to Team Ontario and the Canadian national team.

Playing career
He was selected by the Windsor Spitfires in the first round (5th overall) during the 2012 Ontario Hockey League (OHL) Priority Selection. He was rated a top prospect.

In his first season with the Spitfires, Ho-Sang recorded 44 points in 63 games, finishing sixth among OHL rookies. In December 2012, he played for Team Ontario at the World U-17 Hockey Challenge.  In five games, he had three goals and two assists.

Ho-Sang skated in the 2014 BMO Top Prospects Game, recording one goal and one assist. On April 5, Ho-Sang received a 15-game suspension (later reduced to six games) for the start of the next season for an illegal hit-from-behind to London Knights' defenceman Zach Bell on March 27. The hit resulted in Bell suffering a broken leg.

Ho-Sang was selected by the New York Islanders in the first round (28th overall) in the 2014 NHL Entry Draft. Islanders' general manager Garth Snow indicated he was not worried about Ho-Sang fitting in, saying, "He'll fit right in.  They shit on me too." Snow also stated "We get the players that we feel can help us win. [And] we don’t give a shit what anyone else thinks." In October 2014, the Islanders signed Ho-Sang to a three-year, entry-level contract.

Ho-Sang was returned to the Spitfires for the 2014–15 season. On November 14, he was traded to the Niagara IceDogs in exchange for Hayden McCool and second-round picks in 2016, 2018 and 2019. He finished the season with 81 points in 60 games.

Ho-Sang was returned to the IceDogs as punishment for being late to the first day of the Islanders' 2015 training camp. In his final season with the IceDogs, Ho-Sang led the team in scoring with 82 points in 66 games. He also recorded 26 points in 17 postseason games; the team lost in four games to the London Knights during the OHL Finals.

Ho-Sang began the 2016–17 season with the Islanders' American Hockey League (AHL) affiliate, the Bridgeport Sound Tigers. On February 28, 2017, he was called up by the Islanders on emergency conditions but was returned to Bridgeport just a few hours later. Ho-Sang was recalled the following day and made his NHL debut with the Islanders on March 2, 2017, against the Dallas Stars. On March 7, in his fourth NHL game, Ho-Sang scored his first NHL goal, a first-period power play goal against the Edmonton Oilers.

Ho-Sang started the 2017–18 season with the Islanders. On October 25, he was assigned to the Sound Tigers after recording four assists in six games. He was recalled on an emergency basis on November 11, 2017. The emergency basis was terminated and changed to a regular recall on November 16. It was short-lived, however, as he was sent back down to the Bridgeport Sound Tigers on December 16, 2017, after recording eight points in 15 games.

After being named the Sound Tigers' Player of the Week on February 17, 2019, Ho-Sang and Michael Dal Colle were recalled to the Islanders on March 5. He was returned to the Sound Tigers on March 8 after sitting as a healthy scratch for two games.

On August 19, 2019, the Islanders re-signed Ho-Sang to a one-year contract extension. However, on September 30 Ho-Sang was placed on waivers by the Islanders. Ho-Sang cleared waivers on October 1, and was assigned to the Bridgeport Sound Tigers to start the 2019-2020 American Hockey League season.

On October 3, 2019, it was reported by Islanders general manager Lou Lamoriello that Ho-Sang had requested a trade through his agent. Ho-Sang, despite clearing waivers and being assigned to the Bridgeport Sound Tigers, was asked not to report to or play. Ho-Sang missed the first 10 weeks of the 2019–20 season, as Lamoriello attempted to meet his trade request.

Unable to facilitate a trade, Ho-Sang returned to the Islanders organization when he was assigned to the Sound Tigers on December 17, 2019. In 16 games with Bridgeport, Ho-Sang posted 3 goals and 10 points before the Islanders reassigned him to join the San Antonio Rampage of the AHL affiliate to the St. Louis Blues, for the remainder of the season on February 28, 2020.

As a restricted free agent, Ho-Sang was signed by New York to a one-year contract extension on October 28, 2020. Remaining with the Islanders through the off-season leading into the pandemic-delayed 2020–21 season, Ho-Sang attended training camp before he was reassigned by the Islanders on loan to Swedish top-tier club, Örebro HK of the Swedish Hockey League (SHL), for the remainder of the season on January 16, 2021. Ho-Sang made just 5 appearances with Örebro, collecting 1 assist, before he was released by the club citing a lack of match fitness on February 10, 2021. Ho-Sang remained in Sweden, agreeing to a loan contract with Linköping HC for the remainder of the season on February 14. On July 28, 2021, Ho-Sang was invited to the Toronto Maple Leafs' 2021–22 training camp on a professional tryout contract (PTO). On October 5, 2021, Ho-Sang signed a standard player contract with the Toronto Marlies of the AHL and was subsequently released by the Leafs from the PTO.

As a free agent from the Marlies, on July 13, 2022, Ho-Sang signed a one-year contract with Russian club Salavat Yulaev Ufa of the KHL for the 2022–23 season.

Jersey number
Ho-Sang chose to wear sweater #66 for the Islanders as an homage to Mario Lemieux, who, in response to the controversy generated by the choice, said he had no problem with Ho-Sang wearing the number. Ho-Sang defended his choice, arguing that he did not merely pay homage to Lemieux's on-ice prowess but also his contributions to the community of Pittsburgh. "He fought and continues to fight for other people," Ho-Sang said. "He thinks outside himself. For me, that's a man worth looking up to. That's why I wear the number. That's the type of guy who's behind that number, and that's what's so inspiring for me...." He is the second player, after Calgary Flames defenceman T. J. Brodie, to wear the number after Lemieux in a regular season game. At the start of the 2018–19 NHL pre-season Ho-Sang was asked by general manager Lou Lamoriello to change his Islanders jersey number, as Lamoriello has long stood by a policy which generally forbids players from wearing any number higher than 35. Ho-Sang chose to wear #26 instead.

International play
In January 2022, Ho-Sang was selected to play for Team Canada at the 2022 Winter Olympics.

Career statistics

Regular season and playoffs

International

Awards and honours

See also
List of select Jewish ice hockey players

References

External links
 

1996 births
Black Canadian ice hockey players
Black Jewish people
Bridgeport Sound Tigers players
Canadian expatriate ice hockey players in Sweden
Canadian ice hockey right wingers
Canadian people of Chilean-Jewish descent
Canadian people of Jamaican descent
Canadian people of Russian-Jewish descent
Canadian people of Swedish descent
Canadian sportspeople of Chinese descent
Canadian sportspeople of Hong Kong descent
Jewish Canadian sportspeople
Jewish ice hockey players
Linköping HC players
Living people
National Hockey League first-round draft picks
New York Islanders draft picks
New York Islanders players
Niagara IceDogs players
Örebro HK players
People from Thornhill, Ontario
Salavat Yulaev Ufa players
San Antonio Rampage players
Ice hockey people from Toronto
Toronto Marlies players
Windsor Spitfires players
Ice hockey players at the 2022 Winter Olympics
Olympic ice hockey players of Canada